KVDO may refer to:

 KVDO-LD, a low-power television station (channel 34, virtual 17) licensed to serve Albany, Oregon, United States
 KOAB-TV, a television station (channel 11, virtual 3) licensed to serve Bend, Oregon, which held the call sign KVDO-TV from 1970 to 1983
 KVDO-LP, a defunct low-power television station (channel 25) formerly licensed to serve Clear Lake, Texas, United States